Hervenogi Unzola  is a German football defender who most recently played for SG Wattenscheid 09.

On 24 July 2013, he joined Sportfreunde Lotte in Regionalliga West. A year later he signed for SC Verl.

References

External links
 
 Hervenogi Unzola at Soccerway

Living people
1992 births
German footballers
Association football defenders
Borussia Dortmund II players
Sportfreunde Lotte players
SC Verl players
Rot-Weiss Essen players
SG Wattenscheid 09 players
3. Liga players